Chữ Nôm is a logographic writing system formerly used to write the Vietnamese language. It uses Chinese characters (chữ Hán) to represent Sino-Vietnamese vocabulary and some native Vietnamese words, with other words represented by new characters created using a variety of methods, including phono-semantic compounds. This composite script was therefore highly complex, and was accessible only to the small proportion of the Vietnamese population who had mastered written Chinese.

Although formal writing in Vietnam was done in classical Chinese until the early 20th century (except for two brief interludes), chữ Nôm was widely used between the 15th and 19th centuries by the Vietnamese cultured elite for popular works in the vernacular, many in verse. One of the best-known pieces of Vietnamese literature, The Tale of Kiều, was written in chữ Nôm by Nguyễn Du.

The Vietnamese alphabet created by Portuguese Jesuit missionaries, with the earliest known usage occurring in the 17th century, replaced chữ Nôm as the preferred way to record Vietnamese literature from the 1920s. While Chinese characters are still used for decorative, historic and ceremonial value, chữ Nôm has fallen out of mainstream use in modern Vietnam. In the 21st century, chữ Nôm is being used in Vietnam for historical and liturgical purposes. The Institute of Hán-Nôm Studies at Hanoi is the main research centre for pre-modern texts from Vietnam, both Chinese-language texts written in Chinese characters and Vietnamese-language texts in chữ Nôm.

Etymology
The Vietnamese word  'character' is derived from the Middle Chinese word  , meaning '[Chinese] character'. The word  'Southern' is derived from the Middle Chinese word  , meaning 'south'.

There are many ways to write the name  in chữ Nôm characters.

Terminology

 is the logographic writing system of the Vietnamese language. It is based on the Chinese writing system but adds a large number of new characters to make it fit the Vietnamese language.

Hán văn means classical Chinese literature.

The term  ( 'Han and chữ Nôm characters') in Vietnamese designates the whole body of premodern written materials from Vietnam, either written in Chinese or in Vietnamese. Hán and Nôm could also be found in the same document side by side, for example, in the case of translations of books on Chinese medicine. The Buddhist history Cổ Châu Pháp Vân phật bản hạnh ngữ lục (1752) gives the story of early Buddhism in Vietnam both in Hán script and in a parallel Nôm translation. The Jesuit Girolamo Maiorica (1605–1656) had also used parallel Hán and Nôm texts.

The term  ( 'national language script') refers to the Vietnamese alphabet in current use, but used to refer to chữ Nôm before the Vietnamese alphabet was widely used.

History 

Chinese characters were introduced to Vietnam after the Han dynasty conquered Nanyue in 111 BC.  Independence was achieved afer the Battle of Bạch Đằng in 938 AD, but Literary Chinese was adopted for official purposes in 1010. For most of the period up to the early 20th century, formal writing was indistinguishable from contemporaneous classical Chinese works produced in China, Korea, and Japan.

Vietnamese scholars were thus intimately familiar with Chinese writing.  In order to record their native language, they applied the structural principles of Chinese characters to develop chữ Nôm.  The new script was mostly used to record folk songs and for other popular literature.  Vietnamese written in chữ Nôm briefly replaced Chinese for official purposes under the Hồ dynasty (1400–1407) and under the Tây Sơn (1778–1802), but in both cases this was swiftly reversed.

Early development

The use of Chinese characters to transcribe the Vietnamese language can be traced to an inscription with the two characters "", as part of the posthumous title of Phùng Hưng, a national hero who succeeded in briefly expelling the Chinese in the late 8th century. The two characters have literal Chinese meanings 'cloth' and 'cover', which make no sense in this context.  They have thus been interpreted as a phonetic transcription, via their Middle Chinese pronunciations buH kajH, of a Vietnamese phrase, either  'great king', or  'father and mother' (of the people).

After Vietnam established its independence from China in the 10th century, Đinh Bộ Lĩnh (r. 968–979), the founder of the Đinh dynasty, named the country   ("Dà qú yuè" in modern Pinyin). The first and third Chinese characters mean 'great' and 'Viet'. The second character was often used to transcribe non-Chinese terms and names phonetically. Scholars assume that it was used here to represent a native Vietnamese word, possibly also meaning 'great', though exactly which Vietnamese word it represents is unclear.

The oldest surviving Nom inscription, dating from 1210, is a list naming 21 people and villages on a stele at the Tự Già Báo Ân pagoda in Tháp Miếu village (Mê Linh District, Hanoi). Another stele at Hộ Thành Sơn in Ninh Bình Province (1343) lists 20 villages.

Trần Nhân Tông (r. 1278–1293) ordered that Nôm be used to communicate his proclamations to the people.
The first literary writing in Vietnamese is said to have been an incantation in verse composed in 1282 by the Minister of Justice Nguyễn Thuyên and thrown into the Red River to expel a menacing crocodile.
Four poems written in Nom from the Tran dynasty, two by Trần Nhân Tông and one each by Huyền Quang and Mạc Đĩnh Chi, were collected and published in 1805.

The Nôm text  ('Sūtra explained by the Buddha on the Great Repayment of the Heavy Debt to Parents') was printed around 1730, but conspicuously avoids the character  , suggesting that it was written (or copied) during the reign of Lê Lợi (1428–1433).
Based on archaic features of the text compared with the Tran dynasty poems, including an exceptional number of words with initial consonant clusters written with pairs of characters, some scholars suggest that it is a copy of an earlier original, perhaps as early as the 12th century.

Hồ dynasty (1400–07) and Ming conquest (1407–27)

During the seven years of the Hồ dynasty (1400–07) Classical Chinese was discouraged in favor of vernacular Vietnamese written in Nôm, which became the official script. The emperor Hồ Quý Ly even ordered the translation of the Book of Documents into Nôm and pushed for reinterpretation of Confucian thoughts in his book Minh đạo. These efforts were reversed with the fall of the Hồ and Chinese conquest of 1407, lasting twenty years, during which use of the vernacular language and demotic script were suppressed.

During the Ming dynasty occupation of Vietnam, chữ Nôm printing blocks, texts and inscriptions were thoroughly destroyed; as a result the earliest surviving texts of chữ Nôm post-date the occupation.

From 15th to 19th century 

Among the earlier works in Nôm of this era are the writings of Nguyễn Trãi (1380–1442). The corpus of Nôm writings grew over time as did more scholarly compilations of the script itself.

While almost all official writings and documents continued to be written in classical Chinese until the early 20th century, Nôm was the preferred script for literary compositions of the cultural elites. Nôm reached its golden period with the Nguyễn dynasty in the 19th century as it became a vehicle for diverse genres, from novels to theatrical pieces, and instructional manuals. Although it was prohibited during the reign of Minh Mang (1820–1840), apogees of Vietnamese literature emerged with Nguyễn Du's The Tale of Kiều and Hồ Xuân Hương's poetry. Although literacy in premodern Vietnam was limited to just 3 to 5 percent of the population, nearly every village had someone who could read Nôm aloud for the benefit of other villagers. Thus these Nôm works circulated orally in the villages, making it accessible even to the illiterates.

Chữ Nôm was the dominant script in Vietnamese Catholic literature until the late 19th century. In 1838, Jean-Louis Taberd compiled a Nôm dictionary, helping with the standardization of the script.

The reformist Catholic scholar Nguyễn Trường Tộ presented the Emperor Tự Đức with a series of unsuccessful petitions (written in classical Chinese, like all court documents) proposing reforms in several areas of government and society. His petition  ( 'Eight urgent matters', 1867), includes proposals on education, including a section entitled  ('Please tolerate the national voice'). He proposed to replace classical Chinese with Vietnamese written using a script based on Chinese characters that he called  ( 'Han characters with national pronunciations'), though he described this as a new creation, and did not mention chữ Nôm.

French Indochina and the Latin alphabet
From the latter half of the 19th century onwards, the French colonial authorities discouraged or simply banned the use of classical Chinese, and promoted the use of the Vietnamese alphabet, which they viewed as a stepping stone toward learning French. Language reform movements in other Asian nations stimulated Vietnamese interest in the subject. Following the Russo-Japanese War of 1905, Japan was increasingly cited as a model for modernization. The Confucian education system was compared unfavorably to the Japanese system of public education. According to a polemic by writer Phan Châu Trinh, "so-called Confucian scholars" lacked knowledge of the modern world, as well as real understanding of Han literature. Their degrees showed only that they had learned how to write characters, he claimed.

The popularity of Hanoi's short-lived Tonkin Free School suggested that broad reform was possible. In 1910, the colonial school system adopted a "Franco-Vietnamese curriculum", which emphasized French and alphabetic Vietnamese. The teaching of Chinese characters was discontinued in 1917. On December 28, 1918, Emperor Khải Định declared that the traditional writing system no longer had official status. The traditional Civil Service Examination, which emphasized the command of classical Chinese, was dismantled in 1915 in Tonkin and was given for the last time at the imperial capital of Huế on January 4, 1919. The examination system, and the education system based on it, had been in effect for almost 900 years. 

The decline of the Chinese script also led to the decline of chữ Nôm given that Nôm and Chinese characters are so intimately connected. After the First World War, chữ Nôm gradually died out as the Vietnamese alphabet grew more and popular. In an article published in 1935 (based on a lecture given in 1925), Georges Cordier estimated that 70% of literate persons knew the alphabet, 20% knew chữ Nôm and 10% knew Chinese characters.
However, estimates of the rate of literacy in the late 1930s range from 5% to 20%.
By 1953, literacy (using the alphabet) had risen to 70%.

The Gin people, descendants of 16th-century migrants from Vietnam to islands off Dongxing in southern China, now speak a form of Yue Chinese and Vietnamese, but their priests use songbooks and scriptures written in chữ Nôm in their ceremonies.

Texts

Đại Việt sử ký tiệp lục tổng tự. This history of Vietnam was written during the Tây Sơn dynasty. The original is Hán, and there is also a Nôm translation.
Nguyễn Du, The Tale of Kieu (1820) The poem is full of obscure archaic words and Chinese borrowings, so that modern Vietnamese struggle to understand an alphabetic transcription without clarifications.
Nguyễn Trãi, Quốc âm thi tập ("National Language Poetry Compilation") 
Phạm Đình Hồ, Nhật Dụng Thường Đàm (1851). A Hán-to-Nôm dictionary for Vietnamese speakers.
Nguyễn Đình Chiểu, Lục Vân Tiên (19th century)
Đặng Trần Côn, Chinh Phụ Ngâm Khúc (18th century)
Various poems by Hồ Xuân Hương (18th century)
Mechanics and Crafts of the People of Annam French manuscript with illustrations depicting Vietnamese culture in French Indochina, the illustrations are described in chữ Nôm.

Characters
Vietnamese is a tonal language, like Chinese, and has nearly 5,000 distinct syllables.
In chữ Nôm, each monosyllabic word of Vietnamese was represented by a character, either borrowed from Chinese or locally created.
The resulting system was even more difficult to use than the Chinese script.

As an analytic language, Vietnamese was a better fit for a character-based script than Japanese and Korean, with their agglutinative morphology.
Partly for this reason, there was no development of a phonetic system that could be taught to the general public, like Japanese kana syllabary or the Korean hangul alphabet.
Moreover, most Vietnamese literati viewed Chinese as the proper medium of civilized writing, and had no interest in turning Nôm into a form of writing suitable for mass communication.

Variant characters 
Chữ Nôm has never been standardized. As a result, a Vietnamese word could be represented by several Nôm characters. Both characters were invented for Vietnamese and have a semantic-phonetic structure, the difference being the phonetic indicator ( vs. ).

Another example of a Vietnamese word that is represented by several Nôm characters is the word for moon, trăng.

Borrowed characters

Unmodified Chinese characters were used in chữ Nôm in three different ways.

 A large proportion of Vietnamese vocabulary had been borrowed from Chinese from the Tang period. Such Sino-Vietnamese vocabulary could be written with the original Chinese character for each word, for example:
   ('service', 'corvée'), from Early Middle Chinese (EMC) 
   ('root', 'foundation'), from EMC 
   ('head'), from EMC 
 One way to represent a native Vietnamese word was to use a Chinese character for a Chinese word with a similar meaning. For example,  may also represent  ('capital, funds').  In this case, the word  is actually an earlier Chinese loan that has become accepted as Vietnamese; William Hannas claims that all such readings are similar early loans.
 Alternatively, a native Vietnamese word could be written using a Chinese character for a Chinese word with a similar sound, regardless of the meaning of the Chinese word. For example,  (Early Middle Chinese ) may represent the Vietnamese word  ('one').

The first two categories are similar to the on and kun readings of Japanese kanji respectively. The third is similar to ateji, in which characters are used only for their sound value, or the Man'yōgana script that became the origin of hiragana and katakana.

When a character would have two readings, a diacritic may be added to the character to indicate the "indigenous" reading.

Locally invented characters

In contrast to the few hundred Japanese kokuji (国字) and handful of Korean gukja (국자, 國字), which are mostly rarely used characters for indigenous natural phenomena, Vietnamese scribes created thousands of new characters, used throughout the language.

As in the Chinese writing system, the most common kind of invented character in Nôm is the phono-semantic compound, made by combining two characters or components, one suggesting the word's meaning and the other its approximate sound. For example,
  ( 'three') is composed of the phonetic part  and the semantic part  'three'.

A smaller group consists of semantic compound characters, which are composed of two Chinese characters representing words of similar meaning.

A few characters were obtained by modifying Chinese characters related either semantically or phonetically to the word to be represented. For example,
 the Nôm character  ( 'that', 'those') is a simplified form of the Chinese character .
 the Nôm character  ( 'work', 'labour') is a simplified form of the Chinese character  ( >  > ).
 the Nôm character  (một 'one') comes from the right part of the Chinese character .

Example

As an example of the way chữ Nôm was used to record Vietnamese, the first two lines of the Tale of Kiều (1866 edition), written in the traditional six-eight form of Vietnamese verse, consist of the following 14 characters:

This is translated as 'A hundred years—in this life span on earth, talent and destiny are apt to feud.'

Most common characters
The website chunom.org gives a frequency table of the 586 most common characters in Nôm literature. According to this table, the most common 50 characters are as follows, with the modern spelling given in italics:

   to be
   and
   each; every
   one
   there is
   of
   to get, to obtain
   in
   clear
  (or )  people
   (plural marker)
   to learn
   as
   word
   to meet
   or, good
   not
   body
   four
   also
  ,  with
   to give
   society, company
  ,  place
   to place
   frontier, barrier, gate
   to see
   school
   to return; about
   classic works, sutra
   sail; navigate
  ,  to give birth, to be prepared
   to get out
   world; era
   to replace
   position, power; like that, so
   frequent; common, normal, usual
   matter; event
   there; that
   to cross
   border
   head; top (of a multitude)
   to throw, to send
   but
   class, group
   another, different; further
   first
   arrive, reach

Computer encoding
In 1993, the Vietnamese government released an 8-bit coding standard for alphabetic Vietnamese (TCVN 5712:1993, or VSCII), as well as a 16-bit standard for Nôm (TCVN 5773:1993). This group of glyphs is referred to as "V0." In 1994, the Ideographic Rapporteur Group agreed to include Nôm characters as part of Unicode. A revised standard, TCVN 6909:2001, defines 9,299 glyphs. About half of these glyphs are specific to Vietnam. Nôm characters not already encoded were added to CJK Unified Ideographs Extension B. (These characters have five-digit hexadecimal code points. The characters that were encoded earlier have four-digit hex.)

Characters were extracted from the following sources:
 Hoàng Triều Ân, Tự điển chữ Nôm Tày [Nôm of the Tay People], 2003.
 Institute of Linguistics, Bảng tra chữ Nôm [Nôm Index], Hanoi, 1976.
 Nguyễn Quang Hồng, editor, Tự điển chữ Nôm [Nôm Dictionary], 2006.
 Father Trần Văn Kiệm, Giúp đọc Nôm và Hán Việt [Help with Nôm and Sino-Vietnamese], 2004.
 Vũ Văn Kính & Nguyễn Quang Xỷ, Tự điển chữ Nôm [Nôm Dictionary], Saigon, 1971.
 Vũ Văn Kính, Bảng tra chữ Nôm miền Nam [Table of Nôm in the South], 1994.
 Vũ Văn Kính, Bảng tra chữ Nôm sau thế kỷ XVII [Table of Nôm After the 17th Century], 1994.
 Vũ Văn Kính, Đại tự điển chữ Nôm [Great Nôm Dictionary], 1999.
 Nguyễn Văn Huyên, Góp phần nghiên cứu văn hoá Việt Nam [Contributions to the Study of Vietnamese Culture], 1995.

The V2, V3, and V4 proposals were developed by a group at the Han-Nom Research Institute led by Nguyễn Quang Hồng. V4, developed in 2001, includes over 400 ideograms formerly used by the Tày people of northern Vietnam. This allows the Tày language to get its own registration code. V5 is a set of about 900 characters proposed in 2001. As these characters were already part of Unicode, the IRG concluded that they could not be edited and no Vietnamese code was added. (This is despite the fact that national codes were added retroactively for version 3.0 in 1999.) The Nôm Na Group, led by Ngô Thanh Nhàn, published a set of nearly 20,000 Nôm characters in 2005. This set includes both the characters proposed earlier and a large group of additional characters referred to as "V6". These are mainly Han characters from Trần Văn Kiệm's dictionary which were already assigned code points. Character readings were determined manually by Hồng's group, while Nhàn's group developed software for this purpose. The work of the two groups was integrated and published in 2008 as the Hán Nôm Coded Character Repertoire.

The characters that do not exist in Chinese have Sino-Vietnamese readings that are based on the characters given in parentheses. The common character for càng contains the radical  (insects). This radical is added redundantly to create , a rare variation shown in the chart above. The character  (chàu) is specific to the Tày people. It has been part of the Unicode standard only since version 8.0 of June 2015, so there is still very little font and input method support for it.

See also 

 Chinese family of scripts
 Sinoxenic

Notes

References

Works cited

Further reading
Chʻen, Ching-ho (n. d.). A Collection of Chữ Nôm Scripts with Pronunciation in Quốc-Ngữ. Tokyo: Keiô University.
 Nguyễn, Đình Hoà (2001). Chuyên Khảo Về Chữ Nôm = Monograph on Nôm Characters. Westminster, California: Institute of Vietnamese Studies, Viet-Hoc Pub. Dept.. 
 Nguyễn, N. B. (1984). The State of Chữ Nôm Studies: The Demotic Script of Vietnam. Vietnamese Studies Papers. [Fairfax, Virginia]: Indochina Institute, George Mason University.
 O'Harrow, S. (1977). A Short Bibliography of Sources on "Chữ-Nôm". Honolulu: Asia Collection, University of Hawaii.
Schneider, Paul 1992. Dictionnaire Historique Des Idéogrammes Vietnamiens / (licencié en droit Nice, France : Université de Nice-Sophia Antipolis, R.I.A.S.E.M.)
Zhou Youguang  (1998). Bijiao wenzi xue chutan ( "A Comparative Study of Writing Systems"). Beijing: Yuwen chubanshe.
http://www.academia.edu/6797639/Rebooting_the_Vernacular_in_17th-century_Vietnam

External links

Chunom.org  "This site is about Chữ Nôm, the classical writing system of Vietnam."
Vietnamese Nôm Preservation Foundation. Features a character dictionary.
Chữ Nôm, Omniglot
The Vietnamese Writing System, Bathrobe's Chinese, Japanese & Vietnamese Writing Systems
 Han-Nom Revival Committee of Vietnam
  VinaWiki – wiki encyclopedia in chữ Nôm with many articles transliterated from the Vietnamese Wikipedia
 Han-Nom Research Institute
 Tự Điển Chữ Nôm Trích Dẫn – Dictionary of Nôm characters with excerpts, Institute of Vietnamese Studies, 2009
 Vấn đề chữ viết nhìn từ góc độ lịch sử tiếng Việt, Trần Trí Dõi

Chữ Nôm to Vietnamese Latin Converter

Texts

The Digital Library of Hán-Nôm, digitized manuscripts held by the National Library of Vietnam.

Software
There are a number of software tools that can produce chữ Nôm characters simply by typing Vietnamese words in chữ quốc ngữ:
HanNomIME, a Windows-based Vietnamese keyboard driver that supports Hán characters and chữ Nôm.
Vietnamese Keyboard Set which enables chữ Nôm and Hán typing on Mac OS X.
WinVNKey, a Windows-based Vietnamese multilingual keyboard driver that supports typing chữ Nôm in addition to Traditional and Simplified Chinese.
Chunom.org Online Editor, a browser-based editor for typing chữ Nôm.
Bộ gõ Hán Nôm: Phương Viên, a rime-based IME for typing chữ Nôm.
Other entry methods:
  Cangjie input method for Windows that allows keyboard entry of all Unicode CJK characters by character shape. Supports over 70,000 characters. Users may add their own characters and character combinations.

Fonts
Fonts with a sufficient coverage of Chữ Nôm characters include Han-Nom Gothic, Han-Nom Minh, Han-Nom Ming, Han-Nom Kai, Nom Na Tong, STXiHei (Heiti TC), MingLiU plus MingLiU-ExtB, Han Nom A plus Han Nom B, FZKaiT-Extended plus FZKaiT-Extended(SIP), and Mojikyō fonts which require special software. The following web pages are collections of URLs from which Chữ Nôm capable fonts can be downloaded:
Fonts for Chu Nom on chunom.org.
Han-Nom Fonts on hannom-rcv.org.

Writing systems
Logographic writing systems
Vietnamese writing systems
Chinese scripts
Vietnamese inventions